Sussan Nourshargh is a British immunologist, pharmacologist, and professor of microvascular pharmacology and immunopharmacology. She founded the Centre for Microvascular research at Queen Mary University.

Career 
Sussan Nourshargh studied pharmacology (BSc) at University College London and did her PhD at King's College London.

Nourshargh held a post-doctoral research scientist post in vascular biology at MRC Clinical Sciences Centre, London between 1986-1988. In 1988 she became a senior lecturer within the department of Applied Pharmacology at the National Heart and Lung Institute, part of Imperial College London.

In 2006 Nourshargh became a professor of immunopharmacology at Imperial College London, a year later she founded the Centre for Microvascular Research within the William Harvey Research Institute at Queen Mary University.

Awards 

 2016: The Gabor Kaley Prize in Microcirculation Research from the American Societies of Physiology and Microcirculation.
 2014: The Astra Zeneca Prize for Women in Pharmacology from the British Pharmacology Society.
 2001: Quintiles Prize for outstanding contribution to Immunopharmacology from the British Pharmacology Society.

Fellowships 

 2012: Wellcome Trust Senior Investigator Award.
 2012: Fellow of the Academy of Medical Sciences.
 2010: Fellow of the Society of Biology.
 2005: Fellow of the British Pharmacological Society.
 1996: Wellcome Trust University Award.
 1990: Wellcome Trust Career Development Fellowship.

Memberships 

 2015 - current: British Heart Foundation Board of Trustees and Advisory Council
 2015-2018: Wellcome Trust’s Biomedical Resources & Multi-User Equipment Committee
 2015-2017: Academy of Medical Sciences Springboard Panel
 2012-2017: Chair and Member of the Academy of Medical Sciences Committee (SC3) for selection of new fellows
 2014-2016: Royal Society’s Newton Advanced Fellowship Panel
 2011-2014: British Heart Foundation Fellowship Committee
 2012-2016: Wellcome Trust’s Peer Review College
 2007-2016: Treasurer of the UK Adhesion Society
 2013 - current: Editor, European Journal of Immunology
 2010-2013: Editor, British Journal of Pharmacology

References 

Women immunologists
Women pharmacologists
Year of birth missing (living people)
Living people
British pharmacologists
British women scientists
British immunologists
Alumni of King's College London
Alumni of University College London
Fellows of the British Pharmacological Society
Fellows of the Academy of Medical Sciences (United Kingdom)
Academics of Imperial College London
Fellows of The Society of Biology
Academic journal editors